This is a list of notable U.S. state officials convicted of only certain select federal public corruption offenses for conduct while in office. The list is organized by office. Acquitted officials are not listed (if an official was acquitted on some counts, and convicted on others, the counts of conviction are listed). Officials convicted of state crimes are not listed.

For a more complete list see: List of American state and local politicians convicted of crimes.

The criminal statute(s) under which the conviction(s) were obtained are noted, as are the names of notable investigations or scandals, if applicable. If a defendant is convicted of a conspiracy to commit a corruption offense, the substantive offense is listed.

Criminal convictions such as making false statements, perjury, obstruction of justice, electoral fraud, and campaign finance regulations, tax evasion, and money laundering even if related, are not included in this list.

Certain details, including post-conviction relief, if applicable, are included in footnotes. For example, several officials obtained post-conviction relief after the Supreme Court's decisions narrowing the mail fraud statute in McNally v. United States (1987) and Skilling v. United States (2010) and narrowing the Hobbs Act in McCormick v. United States (1991).

The Hobbs Act (enacted 1934), the mail and wire fraud statutes (enacted 1872), including the honest services fraud provision, the Travel Act (enacted 1961), the Racketeer Influenced and Corrupt Organizations Act (RICO) (enacted 1970), and the federal program bribery statute, 18 U.S.C. § 666 (enacted 1984), permit the prosecution of such officials. These statutes are also applicable to corrupt federal officials. In addition, federal officials are subject to the federal bribery, graft, and conflict-of-interest crimes contained in Title 18, Chapter 11 of the United States Code, 18 U.S.C. §§ 201–227, which do not apply to state and local officials.

Governors

Cabinet members

Legislators

See also
List of federal political scandals in the United States

References

State officials convicted of federal corruption offenses

Lists of criminals